The 2008 KNVB Cup Final was a football match between Feyenoord and Roda JC on 27 April 2008 at De Kuip, Rotterdam. It was the final match of the 2007–08 KNVB Cup competition. Feyenoord beat Roda JC 2–0 after goals from Denny Landzaat and Jonathan de Guzmán. It was their eleventh KNVB Cup triumph.

Route to the final

Match

Details

References

2008
2007–08 in Dutch football
Feyenoord matches
Roda JC Kerkrade matches
April 2008 sports events in Europe